Khutitoli  is a village in Simdega district of Jharkhand state of India.

References

Villages in Simdega district